Degang Chen professor at Iowa State University, was named Fellow of the Institute of Electrical and Electronics Engineers (IEEE) in 2016 for contributions to testing of analog and mixed-signal integrated circuits.

Chen obtained his BS from Tsinghua University in 1984 and then his MS and Ph.D. in Electrical and Computer engineering from the University of California, Santa Barbara in 1988 and 1992 respectively.

References

20th-century births
Living people
Chinese computer scientists
Chinese electrical engineers
Tsinghua University alumni
University of California, Santa Barbara alumni
Iowa State University faculty
Fellow Members of the IEEE
Year of birth missing (living people)
Place of birth missing (living people)